Olegs Sorokins (born 4 January 1974 in Riga, Soviet Union) is a retired Latvian professional ice hockey defender. He played in HK Ozolnieki/Monarhs team in Latvian Hockey League in 2008, before joining Dinamo Riga of KHL for two seasons.

Career statistics

Regular season and playoffs

LAT stats do not include numbers from the 1995–96 and 2002–03 seasons.

International

References

External links
 

1974 births
Living people
Ässät players
EHC Black Wings Linz players
Dinamo Riga players
Empire State Cobras players
Frederikshavn White Hawks players
HC Fribourg-Gottéron players
Kokkolan Hermes players
Ice hockey players at the 2002 Winter Olympics
Jacksonville Lizard Kings players
Latvian ice hockey defencemen
Metallurg Novokuznetsk players
Molot-Prikamye Perm players
Olympic ice hockey players of Latvia
Quad City Mallards (CoHL) players
HK Riga 2000 players
Roanoke Express players
Saryarka Karagandy players
HC Slovan Bratislava players
Södertälje SK players
Ice hockey people from Riga
Utica Blizzard players
Vaasan Sport players
Wipptal Broncos players
Latvian expatriate sportspeople in the United States
Latvian expatriate sportspeople in Finland
Latvian expatriate sportspeople in Slovakia
Latvian expatriate sportspeople in Sweden
Latvian expatriate sportspeople in Russia
Latvian expatriate sportspeople in Kazakhstan
Latvian expatriate sportspeople in Austria
Latvian expatriate sportspeople in Switzerland
Latvian expatriate sportspeople in Denmark
Latvian expatriate sportspeople in Italy
Expatriate ice hockey players in the United States
Expatriate ice hockey players in Finland
Expatriate ice hockey players in Slovakia
Expatriate ice hockey players in Sweden
Expatriate ice hockey players in Russia
Expatriate ice hockey players in Kazakhstan
Expatriate ice hockey players in Austria
Expatriate ice hockey players in Switzerland
Expatriate ice hockey players in Denmark
Expatriate ice hockey players in Italy
Latvian expatriate ice hockey people